The third season of Law & Order: Criminal Intent premiered in the United States on NBC on September 28, 2003 and ended May 23, 2004. The DVD was released in the United States on September 14, 2004.



Cast

Main cast 
 Vincent D'Onofrio as Detective Robert Goren
 Kathryn Erbe as Detective Alexandra Eames
 Jamey Sheridan as Captain James Deakins
 Courtney B. Vance as ADA Ron Carver

Recurring cast 
 Samantha Buck as Detective G. Lynn Bishop. Buck temporarily replaced Kathryn Erbe while she was on maternity leave. (Kathryn did appear briefly in a few episodes until her return.)  Detective Bishop is introduced in episode 5, "Pravda," as the temporary partner of Det. Robert Goren (Vincent D'Onofrio).  She was assigned to the Major Case Squad of the New York City Police Department (NYPD) due to Det. Alexandra Eames volunteering to serve as a surrogate mother for her sister's baby. Bishop's shield number is 6141 -  clearly legible in the episode titled,  "F.P.S.".

Goren's unorthodox ways of solving a case was something Eames had become  accustomed to.  However, Bishop found Goren's methods difficult to keep up with,  ultimately resulting in an often  lack of chemistry between them.  Goren further exacerbated the situation by making unfavorable comparisons between Bishop and Eames.  Det. Bishop's final appearance was in episode 11, "Mad Hops."

Notable guest stars
Olek Krupa as Ben Laurette
Barry Del Sherman as Brent Anderson
Michel Gill as Spencer Anderson
Bobby Cannavale as Julian Bello
Jane Adams as Sylvia Campbell
Terry Serpico as Earl Carnicki
Alicia Coppola as Isobel Carnicki
Anthony Mackie as Carl Hines
Glynn Turman as Roy Hines
Judd Hirsch as Ben Elkins
Rodney Hicks as Jerome Davis
Nikki M. James as Tamara Bates
Thomas G. Waites as Lance Brody
Maria Thayer as Claire Brody
Billy Lush as Conroy "Connie" Smith
Victor Slezak as Reverend Hale
Angelica Page as Paula Connors
Josh Pais as Dr. Ralph Friedman
Theodore Raymond Knight as Neil Colby
Jordan Bridges as Jack Cadogan
Jude Ciccolella as Perry Powell
Charles Rocket as Johnny DePalma
Delaney Williams as Ernie Dominguez
Terrance Quinn as Gordon Buchanan
Brent Spiner as Graham Barnes
Margaret Colin as Dr. Eloise Barnes
Stephen Colbert as James Bennett
John Savage as Mark Farrell
Guy Boyd as Burton Foche
Dana Eskelson as Paige Mullen
Leo Fitzpatrick as Rickie Cozza
Mark Margolis as Don Mario Damiano
Jason Jurman as Danny Lucci
Kevin Tighe as Dr. Edwin Lingard
Bill Sage as Officer Thomas "Tommy" Callahan

Episodes
{| class="wikitable plainrowheaders" style="width:99%"
|- style="color:white"
! style="background:#495469;"|No. inseries
! style="background:#495469;"|No. inseason
! style="background:#495469;"|Title
! style="background:#495469;"|Directed by
! style="background:#495469;"|Written by
! style="background:#495469;"|Original air date
! style="background:#495469;"|Productioncode
! style="background:#495469;"|U.S. viewers(millions)

|}

References

 

Law & Order: Criminal Intent episodes
2003 American television seasons
2004 American television seasons